Hiyama (written: , , , or ) is a Japanese surname. Notable people with the surname include:
, Japanese physicist
, Japanese jazz drummer
, Japanese voice actor
, Japanese baseball player
Tamejiro Hiyama (born 1946), Japanese chemist
, Japanese footballer

Japanese-language surnames